Şükrü Altın (born February 22, 1956; Ilgaz, Çankırı-), Turkish historian, novelist, educator and painter. Şükrü Altın, who published his first work Clock Story in 1990, is married and has three children.

Childhood
He finished Primary School in Güney Village of  Ilgaz; Secondary School in Ilgaz; High School in Ankara Yildirim Beyazit High School, College in Bartın.

Education life
He served as a teacher and school director in Gümüşhane, Kastamonu, Hatay, Sivas and Çankırı. He tutored Turkish to his students. In the following years, he served as the District Director of Education in Korgun/Cankiri, Arac and Kure/Kastamonu, Eflani/Karabuk.

Today
He lectured about his Works in the country and received rewards from different institutions and organizations. He worked as a reporter and did research-investigation and interview writing. His columns and essays have been published in newspapers. He has been continuing to work as a writer since 2008. He is married, with three children. He is moderately fluent in Arabic. Şükrü Altın’s articles are published in the current Çankırı Karatekin Newspaper.

Projects
Şükrü Altın’s novel, Abdülmecid II, The Last caliphate in Exile-an 8-part TV series the director of which is Nazif Tunç and the producer of which is Halk Film company- will be broadcast on TRT screens in the following winter broadcast season.

Awards
Governorship of Karabuk – Service Certificate of Honor
ÇKG Cankiri – Writer of the Year award

Works

References

External links
The Life of the national Poet- TRT OKUL
The biography of the Author
TRT HABER/Haber Tadında
Public Library of Cankiri
Adnan Ötüken Public Library-Ankara
Public Library-Şükrü Altın Works Section
Disaster Years – Essay
Quote News about the Author

1956 births
Living people
People from Çankırı
Turkish historical novelists
Turkish novelists